Rosa Blasi (born December 19, 1972) is an American actress, author, model, and therapist. She is known for her roles as Luisa Delgado in the Lifetime medical drama series Strong Medicine and Barb Thunderman in the Nickelodeon series The Thundermans.

Early life
Blasi was born in Chicago, Illinois on December 19, 1972. Her parents, Rocco and Joyce Blasi, are of Italian, Irish, and Puerto Rican origin. Blasi is a classically trained mezzo soprano. She also comes from a strong theatre background; ranging from the esteemed Piven Performance Company, as well as The Second City, to starring in numerous musicals and touring with Kenny Rogers. Blasi has two sisters, Marina and Tasha, and two brothers, Michael and Rocky.

Career
Blasi's television debut was a recurring role in the CBS soap opera The Bold and the Beautiful. Soon to follow was a starring role in the MTV/UPN sitcom Hitz. She soon found herself guest starring in numerous shows such as Frasier, Becker, Caroline in the City, V.I.P., Grown Ups, and Beverly Hills, 90210. She later starred in the dramatic Showtime film Noriega: God's Favorite. The film was directed by Roger Spottiswoode and co-starred Bob Hoskins.

In her breakout role, Blasi starred in the Lifetime drama series Strong Medicine from 2000 to 2006 as a doctor in a medical drama with a focus on feminist politics, health issues, and class conflict. She made an appearance in "Shootout", a 2005 episode of CSI: Miami. Audiences saw Blasi in her first role in a major film as the wife of Bill Pullman's character in The Grudge.

Blasi appeared during The Vagina Monologues at the Apollo Theater and has also been a recurring performer at the "What a Pair" benefit concert for breast cancer research and has recorded numerous radio and television voice-overs. She was a repeat guest on talk shows such as Politically Incorrect with Bill Maher (where she admitted, in an appearance alongside Rev. Jerry Falwell, "No, my boobs aren't real—they're real paid for, though! No debt collectors trying to repo my boobs!") and The Late Late Show with Craig Kilborn. She played Ronnie Cruz in Make It or Break It. She also played Barb Thunderman in Nickelodeon's The Thundermans, as well as a recurring character in General Hospital. She wrote a comedic memoir titled Jock Itch: Misadventures of a Retired Jersey Chaser (2011) published by HarperCollins.

Personal life
Blasi married New York Giants fullback Jim Finn on February 14, 2004. Blasi gave birth to her first child, a daughter, on September 20, 2006. The couple divorced in 2008.

On May 3, 2014, Blasi married Todd William Harris, a mortgage broker. They married 16 months after they first connected on Match.com. She has a stepdaughter from Harris's previous relationship.

In 2019, Blasi earned her master's degree in clinical psychology from Antioch University Los Angeles and is a registered associate marriage and family therapist with a specialization in addiction and recovery.

On December 24, 2020, her father Rocco died of COVID-19. He was 87 years old.

Filmography

Film

Television series

References

External links

1972 births
Living people
20th-century American actresses
20th-century American singers
20th-century American women singers
21st-century American actresses
21st-century American singers
21st-century American women singers
Actresses from Chicago
American actresses of Puerto Rican descent
American female dancers
American female models
American film actresses
American mezzo-sopranos
American musical theatre actresses
American people of Irish descent
American people of Italian descent
American people of Puerto Rican descent
American philanthropists
American soap opera actresses
American stage actresses
American television actresses
Hispanic and Latino American actresses
Hispanic and Latino American women singers
Singers from Chicago